Jambinai are a Korean avant-rock band formed in Seoul in 2009. Their debut album Différance won the award for Best Crossover Album at the 2013 Korean Music Awards. Their second album Hermitage was released in 2016 on Bella Union.

During the 2018 Winter Olympics closing ceremony in Pyeongchang, Jambinai performed with an orchestra of geomungo players.

Musical style 
Jambinai are known for combining rock music instrumentation (drums, bass guitar, electric guitar) with the use of traditional Korean folk music instruments (haegeum, piri, geomungo). Furthermore, they have been compared to bands like Explosions in the Sky, Godspeed You! Black Emperor, and Mogwai.

Members 
 Kim Bo-mi – haegeum
 Lee Il-woo – electric guitar, piri, taepyeongso, vocals
 Sim Eun-yong – geomungo

Touring musicians
 Ryu Myung-Hoon – drums
 Choi Jae-hyuk – drums
 Ok Ji-hoon – bass guitar
 Yu Byeong-koo – bass guitar

Discography 
Studio albums
 Différance (2012) on GMC Records
 Hermitage (2016) on Bella Union
 ONDA (2019) on Bella Union

EPs
 Jambinai (2010) on GMC Records
Apparition (2022) on Bella Union

Awards and nominations

References

External links 

Jambinai official Facebook
Jambinai page at Bella Union

South Korean alternative rock groups
South Korean folk rock groups
South Korean post-rock groups
Musical groups established in 2009
2009 establishments in South Korea
Bella Union artists